Parasitus coleoptratorum is a species of mite in the family Parasitidae, first described by Carl Linnaeus in 1758 as Acarus coleoptratorum.

Further reading
Hyatt, K.H. - Mites of the subfamily Parasitinae (Mesostigmata: Parasitidae) in the British Isles. in Bulletin of the British Museum (Natural History). 1980
Karg, W - Acari (Acarina), Milben. Unterordnung Anactinochaeta (Parasitiformes). Die freilebenden Gamasina (Gamasides), Raubmilben in Die Tierwelt Deutschlands. 59. Teil. 475 pp. 1971

References

Parasitidae
Taxa named by Carl Linnaeus
Taxa described in 1758